Minnehaha is a mythical Native American character.

Minnehaha may also refer to:

Places

Canada 
 Minnehaha, Saskatchewan, a locality in Rural Municipality of Parkdale No. 498

United States 
Minnehaha, Arizona
Minnehaha, Colorado
In Minnesota:
Min Hi Line, a linear park parallel to Minnehaha Avenue
Minnehaha Academy
Minnehaha Creek
Minnehaha Falls
Minnehaha Falls Lower Glen Trail, a hiking path
Minnehaha Park (Minneapolis)
Minnehaha, Minneapolis, a neighborhood in Minneapolis
Minnehaha Trail, a multi-use path
Minnehaha, New York
Minnehaha, Washington
Minnehaha County, South Dakota
Minnehaha Falls (Georgia)
Minnehaha Island, an island on the Potomac River
Minnehaha Springs, West Virginia

Vessels
 SS Minnehaha, an ocean liner
 Minnehaha (cargo ship), a freighter
 Minnehaha (sternwheeler), a steamboat in Oregon, U.S., in the 1860s and 1870s
 Minnehaha (steamboat), a steamboat on Lake Minnetonka, in Minnesota
 Minne-Ha-Ha II, a steamboat on Lake George

Other uses
 50th Street / Minnehaha Park (Metro Transit station), a light rail station
 The Death of Minnehaha, a poem, song, cantata and painting
 Mine-Haha, or On the Bodily Education of Young Girls, a German novella by Frank Wedekind